'''Mogneville refers to two places in France:

 Mogneville, Oise
 Mognéville, Meuse department